Mountain Dew Baja Blast is a tropical lime-flavored soft drink created for Taco Bell restaurants. Since the original flavor's launch in 2004, the Baja Blast brand has since expanded to include new flavors, alcoholic beverages, and energy drinks, as well as merchandise.

History 
The flavor was first made available in 2004. Created for, and exclusively sold at Taco Bell locations, it was a collaboration between the company and Mountain Dew owners PepsiCo. One of the first instances of a restaurant offering an exclusive soda beverage was created to increase sales of fountain soda. The flavor was heavily promoted at launch with advertising campaigns.

In 2014, ten years after the drink's original launch, it was released for the first time in a packaged format. The retail release was only available for a limited time. The drink was promoted on Twitter, as well as through on-air advertisements featuring Dale Earnhardt Jr.

In January 2014, Taco Bell released Mountain Dew Sangrita Blast, a non-alcoholic sangria flavor, as a sister flavor to Baja Blast, along with a diet version of Baja Blast. 

In 2015, Baja Blast was re-released for a limited time at retail stores, along with Sangrita Blast.

In 2016, the flavor was part of the "DEWcision" campaign. It was put up against Mountain Dew flavor Pitch Black, and fans would vote for their favorite, the winner of which would be kept on store shelves permanently. The campaign featured wide promotion of both flavors, including advertisements, NASCAR paint schemes and a "Dewggro Crag" event themed around the Nickelodeon game show Guts. It was ultimately announced that Pitch Black had won the vote, and would remain on store shelves. As such, Baja Blast was once again discontinued from retailers. 

The flavor has returned to store shelves yearly since 2018. A zero sugar version was offered starting in 2019.

In 2019, Taco Bell began offering a birthday-themed Baja Blast freeze to celebrate the drink's 15th birthday. Select locations, branded "Taco Bell Cantina," offered the alcoholic "Mountain Dew Baja Blast Twisted Freeze." The "Baja Blast Colada" freeze was offered by Taco Bell in 2021.

In 2022, Baja Blast was announced as one of the flavors of the Hard Mountain Dew line of alcoholic beverages, which would release in retail stores later that year. The flavor was added to the Mountain Dew Energy line of energy drinks later that year.

The Baja Blast brand has expanded to include themed merchandise, such as flavored lip balm, room sprays, and Halloween costumes. A limited-edition Baja Blast hot sauce was created in 2023 as part of a giveaway promotion.

Flavors 
In 2021, Baja Blast was released at retail as part of the "Summer of Baja" promotion, alongside new, "spinoff" flavors. These flavors were Baja Punch, a tropical punch flavor, and Baja Flash, a pina colada flavor.

In June 2022, Baja Blast's retail release was accompanied with new flavors Baja Gold, a pineapple flavor, and Baja Mango Gem, a mango flavor. A third new flavor, Baja Deep Dive, was a mystery flavor available exclusively as a giveaway prize.

See also
 List of soft drink brands

References 

Caffeinated soft drinks
Mountain Dew
PepsiCo brands
PepsiCo soft drinks
Food and drink introduced in 2004
Products introduced in the 21st century
Taco Bell